I Don't Wanna Go may refer to:

"I Don't Wanna Go", a song by the Moments, later covered by Joey Travolta from his 1978 self-titled album
"I Don't Wanna Go", a song by Blues Traveler from their 2012 album Suzie Cracks the Whip
"I Don't Wanna Go", a song by Alan Walker and Julie Bergan from the 2018 album Different World

See also
Tenth Doctor, an incarnation of The Doctor from Doctor Who, whose last words were "I don't want to go"